The hairy conger, Bassanago albescens, is a conger of the family Congridae.

References

 Tony Ayling & Geoffrey Cox, Collins Guide to the Sea Fishes of New Zealand,  (William Collins Publishers Ltd, Auckland, New Zealand 1982) 

Congridae
Fish described in 1923